ZAKSA Kędzierzyn-Koźle 2016–2017 season is the 2016/2017 volleyball season for Polish professional volleyball club ZAKSA Kędzierzyn-Koźle.

After achieving title of 2016 Polish Champion in a main players of ZAKSA stayed in team on 2016/17 season: Sam Deroo, Paweł Zatorski, Benjamin Toniutti, Kevin Tillie.

The club competes in:
 Polish Championship
 Polish Cup
 CEV Champions League

Team roster

Squad changes for the 2016–2017 season
In:

Out:

Most Valuable Players

Results, schedules and standings

2016–17 PlusLiga

Regular season

Semifinal

Final

2016–17 CEV Champions League

Pool A

Playoff 12

References

ZAKSA Kędzierzyn-Koźle seasons